Robert Cook Bell (November 1, 1880 – March 17, 1964) was a United States district judge of the United States District Court for the District of Minnesota.

Education and career

Born in Harrisonville, Missouri, Bell received a Bachelor of Laws from the University of Missouri School of Law in 1908. He was in private practice in St. Joseph, Missouri from 1908 to 1916. He was a special assistant to the Attorney General of the United States in the United States Department of Justice in Minnesota from 1916 to 1918, then in Denver, Colorado until 1920, and then in Missouri again in 1921. He returned to private practice in Detroit Lakes, Minnesota from 1921 to 1933, serving as counsel to the Red Lake Indians of Minnesota from 1927 to 1933, and to the Pillager Indians of Minnesota from 1930 to 1933. He was also a member of the Minnesota Senate from 1928 to 1933 and was a Democrat.

Federal judicial service

On June 8, 1933, Bell was nominated by President Franklin D. Roosevelt to a seat on the United States District Court for the District of Minnesota vacated by Judge William Alexander Cant. Bell was confirmed by the United States Senate on June 10, 1933, and received his commission on June 13, 1933. He assumed senior status on May 1, 1961, serving in that capacity until his death on March 17, 1964.

References

Sources
 

1880 births
1964 deaths
People from Detroit Lakes, Minnesota
People from Harrisonville, Missouri
University of Missouri School of Law alumni
Minnesota lawyers
Missouri lawyers
Democratic Party Minnesota state senators
Judges of the United States District Court for the District of Minnesota
United States district court judges appointed by Franklin D. Roosevelt
20th-century American judges